Austroconops is a genus of flies belonging to the family Ceratopogonidae.

The species of this genus are found in Eurasia.

Species:

Austroconops annettae 
Austroconops asiaticus 
Austroconops borkenti 
Austroconops fossilis 
Austroconops gladius 
Austroconops gondwanicus 
Austroconops mcmillani 
Austroconops megaspinus 
Austroconops perrichoti 
Austroconops sibiricus

References

Ceratopogonidae